The  (or Lyon Fair) is a trade fair, traditionally held in March in Lyon, France. Begun as an initiative by Lyon mayor Édouard Herriot in 1916, the fair has been held in the Eurexpo convention center in Chassieu since 1985.

History 

The creation of the Foire de Lyon began in 1916 through an initiative by then mayor Édouard Herriot. He decided to build a vast "Palace" to accommodate the commercial stalls that were crowding the quays and streets, and impeding traffic flow in the area. The Fair Palace was built from 1918 to 1938 on land located between the Rhône and Parc de la Tête d'Or. Subsequent construction did not adhere to the original plan. The buildings of the Fair Palace were ultimately destroyed to make room for the Cité Internationale, leaving only the main façade of the central pavilion, now integrated into the Musée d'art contemporain de Lyon. In 1985 the fair was moved to the Eurexpo convention center in the commune of Chassieu, east of the Metropolis of Lyon.

Themes 

Each edition of the fair, starting from 2006, is devoted to a particular theme.

 2006The People of Tibet, with Maurice Herzog as sponsor
 2007Indonesia
 2008India
 2009Cinema, with Clovis Cornillac as sponsor
 2010Japanese culture
 2011Outer space and science fiction
 2012Native Americans, with sponsor Harlyn Geronimo, great grandson of Geronimo
 2013New York – New York! Exposition on New York City, with Douglas Kennedy as sponsor
 2014Rock Story, an exposition on the history of rock, with Philippe Manœuvre as artistic advisor and sponsor
 2015 (Connected Objects)
 2016 (The Lyon Fair Celebrates 100 Years!)
 2017Viva Cuba
 2018London Edition
 2019San Francisco

See also 
 Foire de Paris

References

External links 

 Official website 

Culture in Lyon
Annual events in France
Exhibitions in France
Spring (season) events in France